Tbilisi Open Air is an annual international music festival, with the emphasis on electronic and rock music, first held in Tbilisi, Georgia, on 15–17 May 2009. After that the festival is organized each year and is widely considered as the biggest music festival in Caucasus region. The festival mainly maintains several-day outdoor event format.

As the organizers of Tbilisi Open Air clarify, the defining idea behind the festival is freedom. This is freedom from stress, clichés, social controls, freedom to create and express, freedom to experience what is valued by every single one of us as individuals.

It was first held in 2009 as an alternative to the Eurovision Song Contest 2009, which Georgia was disqualified from because of the political message of their song, "We Don't Wanna Put In".

2022 

TOA 2022 is set to be held on Lisi Wonderland field and will go  on for 3 days, with 4 stages operating.

2020-2021 

In 2020, Tbilisi Open Air was set to held through 26 June to 28 June, but due to the covid pandemic, it was cancelled.

In 2021, TOA denied holding the concert once again.

2019 

In 2019, TOA was held on the Lisi Wonderland field and went on for 3 days, with 4 stages operating. Total attendance was around 55 000. The festival dates coincided with 20 June Tbilisi Riots. In the light of those events, many statements were made from the festival promoters and artists from the festival stage.

21 June 

Main Stage

 Franz Ferdinand (band) 
 MokuMoku 
 Loudspeakers 
 St. Nudes 
 4D Monster Lobsters 

Eye Stage

 Tobias. 
 Edit Select 
 Boyd Schidt 
 OTHR 

Garden Stage

 1200 Mics By Riktam 
 GMS (Music Group) 
 Psymmetrix 
 Aardvarkk 
 3 of Life 
 Oogway 
 Acidwave 
 Ancient OM 

Singer Jazz Stage

 Dini Virsaladze Quintet 
 Auditorium A Feat Guja Mardini 
 Kemo Sextet 
 Forest Rain 
 Tornike Gagoshvili

22 June 

Main Stage

 Unkle 
 Rhye 
 მწვანე ოთახი 
 არა 
 Nemra 

Eye Stage

 David August 
 Maayan Nidam 
 Gio Shengelia 
 Tomma 
 Bacho 

Garden Stage

 Pixel 
 Dirty Saffi 
 DJ Nuki 
 Marcuss 
 Katana 
 Ellarge 

Singer Jazz Stage

 Blues Factor 
 Freeride 
 Old Road Band 
 Zura Ramishvili Quartet 
 Zuka Simonishvili Quartet 
 Amaze

23 June 

Main Stage

 Mogwai 
 The Subways 
 Michelle Gurevich 
 Salio 
 Bedford Falls 

Eye Stage

 Andrey Pushkarev 
 Matthew Dekay 
 Cestlek
 Mozzy 
 Vako T 
 Lasha Maruashvili 

Zion Garden

 Freedom Fighters 
 Nigel 
 Obri & Zen 
 Additivv 

Singer Jazz Stage

 Bacho Jikidze & Band 
 Windshield 
 Lekso Ratiani 
 Reso Kiknadze Sextet 
 String Quartet Feat. Dani 
 Blue Moor

2018 

In 2018, TOA was held on Lisi Wonderland and had 3 day lineup. Around 70 artists performed on the festival. A new stage - Eye Stage was introduced which was devoted to Techno/House music. Also a new space - Singer Jazz Stage was created which was devoted to mostly jazz artists. Total attendance around 45 000.

22 June 

Main Stage

 Kayakata 
 Sevdaliza 
 Beardyman 
 Che Lingo 
 Toyshen 
 Eko & Vinda Folio 

Eye Stage

 Roman Flugel 
 Cleveland 
 Gio Shengelia 
 Autumn Tree 
 Vako T b2b Mzhavia 

Zion Garden

 Avalon 
 Ritmo 
 Fungus Funk 
 Acidwave 
 Katana 

Singer Jazz Stage

 Reso Kiknadze Quintet

23 June 

Main Stage

 Róisín Murphy 
 Rachael Yamagata 
 Papooz 
 St. Nudes 
 MokuMoku 
 Killages 

Eye Stage

 Alex Niggerman 
 Matthias Meyer 
 Sascha Sibler 
 Liza Rivs 
 Bero 
 Stimmhalt 
 Promescu 

Zion Garden

 Yestermorrow 
 Kala 
 Eldario 
 Oogway 
 Marcuss 
 Ancient Om 
 Ellarge 
 Space Teryaki 
 Tabu 
 Beka Talakhadze 

Singer Jazz Stage

 Dzini virsaladze Trio 
 Blue Moor 
 Lasha Abashmadze Quintet

24 June 

Main Stage

 Tom Odell 
 Konoba 
 Green Room 
 Salio 
 Sophie Villy 
 Lua 

Eye Stage

 Super Flu 
 Gio Shengelia 
 Innelea 
 Dastia 
 So Laut 
 Bekuchi 

Zion Garden

 Anthill 
 Additivv 
 Obri & Zen 
 Neverthesame 
 Dmitree 
 Infest 
 Dm3 
 Kalratry
 Kaya Matu 
 Ra 

Singer Jazz Stage

 Zura Ramishvili Trio 
 Amaze 
 Papuna Sharikadze trio feat Misho Urushadze

2017 

In 2017, TOA was held on Lisi wonderland and had 3 day lineup with around 40 artists. Around 30 000 persons attended the festival.

16 June 

Main Stage

 Anathema (band) 
 Sevdaliza 
 Backwarmer 
 Psychonaut 4
 Dagdagani 

Golden Stage

 Nino Katamadze 
 Ripperton 
 Cobert 
 Bacho 
 Kozmana 

Zion Garden

 Eldario 
 Space Teriyaki 
 Dimitree 
 Marcuss 
 Tabu 
 Additivv

17 June 

Main Stage

 Leningrad (band) 
 Soft Eject 
 Loudspeakers 
 Eko & Vinda Folio 
 არა 

Golden Stage

 Friendly Mosquito 
 Bedford Falls 
 Windshield 
 Alex.Do 
 Greenbeam & Leon 
 Sevda 
 Iazikzazubami 

Zion Garden

 Psysex 
 Go2sky 
 Never thesame 
 Meno 
 Infest 
 Kaya matu

18 June 

Main Stage

 Archive (band) 
 Young Georgian Lolitaz 
 Salio 
 Kung Fu Junkie 
 The Black Marrows 

Golden Stage

 Moku Moku 
 Sexy Bicycle 
 SF - X 
 Oxia 
 Wiedmak 
 Vako T 

Zion Garden

 Dj Goblin 
 Arjun Apu 
 Amrit Pavan 
 Ougway
 Psyrati 
 Katana

2016 

In 2016, TOA presented 3 day line up with over 60 artists. Festival had 3 stages - Main stage, LTFR/Night stage and Pirate Bay stage. Total attendance was over 30 000. Festival was held on 29–31 July, on a location near Lisi Lake, which received nickname "Lisi Wonderland".

29 July 

Main Stage

 Air (French band) 
 Morcheeba 
 Motorama (band) 
 Kung - Fu Junkie 
 Dihaj 
 Bedford Falls 

LTFR/Night Stage

 Adriatique 
 Nikakoi & TBA 
 Vako Key 
 Lasha Craft 

Pirate Bay Stage

 Aardvark 
 Pogo 
 FOG 
 Psart 
 Katana 
 Marcuss 
 Meno - Project Pheodal 
 Saba 
 Amit Pavan

30 July 

Main Stage

 Unkle 
 Steve Vai 
 Nika Kocharov & Young Georgian Lolitaz 
 Backwarmer 
 Scarlet. 
 Lelocity 

LTFR/Night Stage

 Moodymann 
 Betoko 
 Henning Baer 
 Vako T. 
 Tuji 
 Rejjie Snow 
 Luna 999 
 Cutkill & Shining 
 Sabanadze 
 Tareshi 
 Exit 

Pirate Bay Stage

 Clarity 
 Dima Dadiani 
 Ciga 
 Subex 
 Mangiphera

31 July 

Main Stage

 Damien Rice 
 Tricky 
 Blue Foundation 
 Eko & Vinda Folio 
 Robi Kukhianidze& Ketato 
 Quartet Diminished 

LTFR/Night Stage

 Dense & Pika 
 The Forest 
 Natalie Beridze TBA 
 Mao 
 Friendly Mosquito 
 Kordz 
 ზურმუხტისფერი ბედის ორდენი
 MAMM 
 EKO 

Pirate Bay Stage

 Black Dub Odyssey 
 Vazhmarr 
 Beveluke 
 Uru 
 Teko 
 Liza Rivs

2015  

In 2015, TOA presented 5 day line up with over 60 artists. This was by far the biggest musical event which has ever happened in Caucasus or Middle Earth and the festival broke all records in social media, having three times bigger feedback than in 2013. Also this was the first time when except main stage, 2 additional stages were built - golden stage and Bassiani stage. Attendance was over 50 000 which was also a record for the whole region.

3 July 

Main Stage

 Zemfira 
 Akvarium 
 The Tiger Lillies 
 Mellow 
 Ducktape 

Golden Stage

 Kollektiv Turmstrasse 
 Stephan Bodzin 
 The Forest 
 Greenbeam & Leon 
 NewA

4 July 

Main Stage

 Archive (band) 
 Soap&Skin 
 Gravity 
 The Black Marrows 
 The Mins  

Golden Stage

 Mujuice 
 Oimactta 
 Zurkin 
 Green Room feat Dato Lomidze 
 Ara 
 Erekle Deisadze & Vinda Folio

5 July 

Main Stage

 Black Label Society 
 Bambir 
 Sophie Villy 
 Scratch The Floor 
 Vanilla Cage  

Golden Stage

 Gui Boratto 
 Bacho & Cobert 
 Vako Key 
 Bero 
 Denis Jones 
 Tomma Chaladze 
 Tserili 
 Old Road Band

6 July 

Main Stage

 Beth Hart 
 Kill It Kid 
 Salio 
 MaMM 
 The Jetbird  

Golden Stage

 The Georgians 
 The Pulse 
 MTP 
 Gacha 
 Vaska 
 Gabunia 
 Vako T 
 Lasha Craft

7 July 

Main Stage

 Placebo (band) 
 Loudspeakers (band) 
 The Bearfox 
 Afternoon Version 
 backwarmer  

Golden Stage

 Lady Heroine 
 Mother on Mondays 
 The Window

2014  

In 2014 the festival returned to three-day outdoor festival format. Total attendance was 21 000. Although criticized for smaller line-up compared to former years, the organizers announced this was "a decision essential to switch back to the fields and prepare for 2015, which should be the biggest event both by line-up and scale". Due to heavy rain and storm on the 2nd day of the festival, Chinawoman and Lapalux were cancelled on 7 June and were added to 8 June line-up.

6 June 

 Nino Katamadze 
 Nikakoi 
 Gravity 
 Ara 
 Lasha Kicks 
 The Black Marrows

7 June 

 Oimactta 
 Lapalux 
 Chinawoman 
 Alina Orlova 
 Loudspeakers  
 Scratch the Floor 
 The Jetbird 
 The Pulse

8 June 

 Nochniye Snaiperi 
 Green Room 
 Kung fu Junkie 
 The Bearfox 
 Electric Appeal 
 Weekend Pop

2013 

In 2013 the festival was held on the Dinamo Arena Stadium. Total attendance was 19 000. With Deep Purple as headliner, the line-up was the biggest happening in the region and received a lot of local and foreign media interest, especially from Armenia, Russia, Turkey and Azerbaijan. Despite this, after the event the organizers of the festival stated their opinion that Tbilisi Open Air belonged more to outdoor fields than Stadiums or any kind of buildings. "We received invaluable experience, but the heart of the festival stays with the fields" - stated organizer Achiko Guledani - "next time we will try to accept the challenge to bring even bigger line-up there."

5 June 

 Deep Purple 
 Infected Mushroom 
 Tricky 
 The Subways 
 Modeselektor 
 Black Strobe 
 Kid Jesus

2012  

The 2012 event was held on Tbilisi Valley at the outskirts of the city. Headliner of the festival was a legendary Russian band DDT, which caused a lot of local interest. Total attendance was over 50 000, which remains as a record not only in Georgia, but in whole Caucasus region.

2 June 

 Lyapis Trubetskoy 
 Wasp'N'Hornet 
 Tai Chi Swayze 
 Svansikh 
 Pornopoezia 
 U.R. 
 Outsider 

 dOP 
 Zoo Brazil 
 Green Room 
 Sikha 
 Bero 
 Vako K 
 The Forest 
 Vako T

3 June 

 DDT 
 Dub FX 
 Transmitter 
 Plus Master 
 Rema 
 Zurgi 
 Loudspeakers

2011 

The 2011 event was held on Tbilisi Hippodrome. Total Attendance was 10 000.

11 June 

 Herr Styler 
 Wallace Vanborn 
 The Benedicts 
 Mutual Friends 
 The Smile 
 Ketrine & Me 
 Tako & Green Mama 
 MAMM 
 Z For Zulu

12 June 

 Moodorama 
 The Fades 
 String 
 Exit 
 Pornopoezia 
 Salio 
 Space Jam 
 U.R.

2009 

The 2009 event was held in Tbilisi, on Sharden Street (15 May) and on local hippodrome (16–17 May). Total attendance was 35 000. As it was the first big happening since 1980 Tbilisi Rock Festival, the festival was covered by foreign media: Times Online, Reuters, El Mundo, Corriere della Sera, Associated Press, Nouvel Observateur etc. 23 bands from nine countries participated in the festival. It served as an important simulator to the local music business and caused a boost in the numbers of new artists.

15 May 

 Transglobal Underground 
 The Black & Reds 
 Cheese People 
 The Travelling Band 
 Play Paranoid 
 Smile

16 May 

 Jazzanova Live feat. Paul Randolph 
 ANDY 
 Curry And Coco 
 Laki Lan 
 The Haggis Horns 
 Motel Connection 
 Keti Orjonikidze And Dr. Saga's Funk Rock Project 
 The Dhol Foundation

17 May 

 Rook And The Ravens 
 Brooklyn 
 String 
 Cynic Guru 
 The Blue Van 
 Dubstepler 
 Ten Bears 
 Stephane & 3G 
 Fred Falke

Camping  

In 2012 Tbilisi Open Air started allowing tent camping as an option for festival lodging. The campground site is adjacent to the venue grounds and has its own entrance from the venue. Since then festival receives campers from different countries.

Weather  

The festival is held most often in June. Temperatures during the festival's history have ranged from 25 °C in May to 32 °C on June. Tbilisi has mostly welcoming weather in summer and the same holds true for the event.

Management  

Tbilisi Open Air is run by Altervision Group which mainly consists of former and active musicians/producers. The first concept of the festival was created by Achiko Guledani, Vaho Babunashvili, Irakli Nadareishvili and Beqa Japaridze in 2009. Nowadays the decision making board of Tbilisi Open Air consists of 7 people. The festival is booked by David Tsintsadze.

References

External links
 www.tbilisiopenair.ge
 https://www.facebook.com/tbilisiopenair

Music festivals in Georgia (country)
Open Air
Tourist attractions in Tbilisi
Electronic music festivals in Georgia (country)
2000s in Tbilisi
2010s in Tbilisi
Rock festivals in Georgia (country)
Music festivals established in 2009
2009 establishments in Georgia (country)
Summer events in Georgia (country)